The women's 1500 metres event at the 1999 All-Africa Games was held 15–16 September at the Johannesburg Stadium.

Medalists

Results

Heats
Qualification: First 4 of each heat (Q) and the next 4 fastest (q) qualified for the final.

Final

References

Athletics at the 1999 All-Africa Games